Alfred Maria Willner (11 July 1859 – 27 October 1929) was an Austrian writer, philosopher, musicologist, composer and librettist.

Biography
Alfred Maria Willner was born and died in Vienna.  He began composing mostly music for the piano and eventually made a career writing librettos for ballets, operas and operettas. One of his early operettas was Johann Strauss II’s Die Göttin der Vernunft, a commission that Strauss regretted. Strauss was forced to complete the commission only by the threat of a lawsuit and declined to attend a performance. Later the libretto and score were legally separated, and Willner revised the libretto for Franz Lehár as Der Graf von Luxemburg.

Willner's first big success was his libretto for Leo Fall’s Die Dollarprinzessin, after which he became a much sought-after operetta librettist. The two also collaborated on highly successful adaptations of music by Schubert (such as Das Dreimäderlhaus) and by Johann Strauss father and son (such as Walzer aus Wien). In addition, Willner and Reichert were the contracted librettists for Puccini's opera La rondine which was later adapted by Giuseppe Adami.

Alfred Maria Willner was cremated at Feuerhalle Simmering in Vienna, where also his ashes are buried.

Librettos
Das Heimchen am Herd (opera), music by Karl Goldmark, 1896
Die Schneeflocke (opera), music by Heinrich Berté, 1896
Die Göttin der Vernunft (operetta, with Buchbinder), music by Johann Strauss II, 1897
Fräulein Hexe (operetta, with Buchbinder), music by Josef Bayer, 1898
Die Debutantin (operetta, with Heinrich von Waldberg), music by Alfred Zamara, 1901
Das Baby (operetta, with Waldberg), music by Richard Heuberger, 1902
Die Millionenbraut (operetta, with E. Limé), music by Berté, 1904
Der schöne Gardist (operetta, with A. Landesberg), music by Berté, 1907
Der kleine Chevalier, (operetta), music by Berté, 1907
Die Dollarprinzessin (operetta, with Fritz Grünbaum), music by Leo Fall, 1907
Ein Wintermärchen (Opera), music by Goldmark, 1908
Baron Trenck (operetta, with Robert Bodanzky), music by Felix Albini, 1908
Ein Mädchen für Alles (operetta, with Waldberg), music by Heinrich Reinhardt, 1908
Die Paradiesvögel (operetta, with ), music by Philipp Silber, 1908
Die Glücksnarr (operetta, with Landesberg), music by Berté, 1908
Die Sprudelfee (operetta, with Wilhelm), music by Reinhardt, 1909
Der Graf von Luxemburg (operetta, with Bodanzky), music by Franz Lehár, 1909
Zigeunerliebe (operetta, with Bodanzky), music by Lehár, 1910
Schneeglöckchen (operetta, with Wilhelm), music by G. Kerker, 1910
Das Puppenmädel (operetta, with Leo Stein), music by Leo Fall, 1910
Die schöne Risette (operetta, with Bodanzky), music by Leo Fall, 1910
Die Sirene (operetta, with Leo Stein), music by Leo Fall, 1911
Der Eisenhammer (Opera), music by Blagoje Bersa, 1911 (as Oganj)
Der flotte Bob (operetta, with ), music by K. Stigler, 1911
Die kleine Freundin (operetta, with Leo Stein), music by Oscar Straus, 1911
Eva [Das Fabriksmädel] (operetta, with Bodanzky), music by Lehár, 1911
Casimirs Himmelfahrt (burleske Operette, with Bodanzky), music by Bruno Granichstaedten, 1911
Prinzess Gretl (operetta, with Bodanzky), music by Reinhardt, 1913
Endlich allein (operetta, with Bodanzky), music by Lehár, 1914
Der Schuster von Delft (Opera, with Wilhelm), music by Bersa, 1914 (as Postolar iz Delfta)
Der Märchenprinz (operetta, with Sterk), music by Berté, 1914
Der Durchgang der Venus (operetta, with Rudolf Österreicher), music by Edmund Eysler, 1914
Der künstliche Mensch (operetta, with Österreicher), music by Leo Fall, 1915
Die erste Frau (operetta, with Österreicher), music by Reinhardt, 1915
Wenn zwei sich lieben (operetta, with Bodanzky), music by Eysler, 1915
Die Faschingsfee (operetta, with Österreicher), music by Kálmán, 1917 (based on Zsuzsi kisasszony)
Die schöne Saskia (operetta, with Reichert), music by Oskar Nedbal, 1917
La rondine (opera), music by Giacomo Puccini, 1917
Hannerl [Dreimäderlhaus, part 2] (Singspiel, with Reichert), music by K. Lafite, 1918
Wo die Lerche singt (operetta, with Reichert), music by Lehár, 1918
Johann Nestroy (Singspiel, with Österreicher), music by E. Reiterer, 1918
Nimm mich mit (operetta, with Waldberg), music by H. Dostal, 1919
Der heilige Ambrosius (comedy, with A. Rebner), music by Leo Fall, 1921
Nixchen (operetta, with Österreicher), music by Oscar Straus, 1921
Das Milliardensouper (operetta, with H. Kottow), music by Ernst Steffan, 1921
Frasquita (operetta, with Reichert), music by Lehár, 1922
Libellentanz (Revue-Operette), music by Lehár, 1923
Agri (operetta, with Sterk), music by Ernst Steffan, 1924
Ein Ballroman [Der Kavalier von zehn bis vier] (operetta, with Österreicher and F. Rotter), music by Robert Stolz, 1924
Der Mitternachtswalzer (operetta, with Österreicher), music by Robert Stolz, 1926
Ade, du liebes Elternhaus [Die Lori] (Singspiel, with Reichert), music by O. Jascha, 1928
Rosen aus Florida (operetta, with Reichert), music by Korngold, after Leo Fall, 1929
Walzer aus Wien (Singspiel, with Reichert and Ernst Marischka), music by J. Bittner and Korngold, after J. Strauss II and I, 1930

Filmography
The House of Three Girls, directed by Richard Oswald (Germany, 1918)
Das Milliardensouper , directed by Victor Janson (Germany, 1923)
The Count of Luxembourg, directed by Arthur Gregor (1926)
Der Mitternachtswalzer, directed by Heinz Paul (Austria, 1929)
The Rogue Song, directed by Lionel Barrymore (1930, based on Gypsy Love)
, directed by Hans Steinhoff (Germany, 1931)
Waltzes from Vienna, directed by Alfred Hitchcock (UK, 1934)
Blossom Time, directed by Paul L. Stein (UK, 1934)
Frasquita, directed by Karel Lamač (Austria, 1934)
, directed by Johannes Riemann (Austria, 1935)
Three Girls for Schubert, directed by E. W. Emo (Germany, 1936)
Where the Lark Sings, directed by Karel Lamač (Germany, 1936)
, directed by Hans Wolff (Austria, 1956)
The Count of Luxembourg, directed by Werner Jacobs (West Germany, 1957)
The House of Three Girls, directed by Ernst Marischka (Austria, 1958)
The Count of Luxembourg, directed by Wolfgang Glück (West Germany, 1972)

Sources 
 The New Grove Dictionary of Opera, edited by Stanley Sadie (1992),  and 
 The Oxford Dictionary of Opera, by John Warrack and Ewan West (1992),

External links
https://www.ibdb.com/broadway-cast-staff/dr-a-m-willner-9206 (Alfred Maria Willner at the Internet Broadway Database)

Austrian opera librettists
Austrian male writers
Austrian operetta librettists
Writers from Vienna
1859 births
1929 deaths
Austrian philosophers
Austrian musicologists
Composers from Vienna
Musicians from Vienna
Burials at Feuerhalle Simmering
19th-century musicologists